FSV Krumhermersdorf is an association football club from Krumhermersdorf, Zschopau, Saxony, Germany.

The club was founded on 1 July 1921. Under the name BSG Aufbau Krumhermersdorf and BSG Aufbau dkk Krumhermersdorf, it reached as high as the DDR-Liga, the second tier in East Germany, where it played in the penultimate (1989–90) season of the DDR-Liga. Following the reunification of Germany, the name FSV Krumhermersdorf was assumed in 1991.

References

Further reading
Hanns Leske: Enzyklopädie des DDR-Fußballs. Göttingen: Die Werkstatt, 2007, ISBN 978-3-89533-556-3, p. 453

Football clubs in Germany
Sport in Saxony
Zschopau
1921 establishments in Germany
Association football clubs established in 1921